Lightning Lariats is a 1927 American silent Western film directed by Robert De Lacey and starring Tom Tyler, Dorothy Dunbar and Frankie Darro.

Plot
Following a revolution in his Balkan country, King Alexis escapes to the American West in the company of his American governess where he receives the help of a cowboy to thwart an attempt to kidnap him.

Cast
 Tom Tyler as Tom Potter 
 Dorothy Dunbar as Janet Holbrooke 
 Frankie Darro as Alexis, King of Roxenburg 
 Ruby Blaine as Cynthia Storne 
 Fred Holmes as Henry Storne 
 Ervin Renard as First Officer 
 Karl Silvera as Second Officer 
 Leroy Scott as Gus 
 Gertrude Astor as Girl

References

External links
 

1927 films
1927 Western (genre) films
Films directed by Robert De Lacey
American black-and-white films
Film Booking Offices of America films
Silent American Western (genre) films
1920s English-language films
1920s American films